Ayni Air Force Base, also known as Gissar Air Base, is a military air base in Tajikistan,  west of the capital Dushanbe. The base is jointly operated by the Indian Air Force and the Tajik Air Force. It is India's second overseas air base after Farkhor. Since 2014 India has deployed Su-30MKI in limited numbers at this base. The base was extensively used by Indian Air Force as a standby base for its aircraft to evacuate Indian Nationals from Kabul Airport amidst the Afghan Crisis.

History
Reports began circulating in early 2000s that India would establish air bases at Ayni and Farkhor in Tajikistan. Both Indian and Tajik officials issued immediate denials, but they did admit that India had been renovating the bases since 2002.

In January 2011, Tajik Foreign Minister, Hamrohan Zarifi, officially launched negotiations with Russia to discuss possible deployment of Russian military at Ayni. Zarifi also ruled out deployment of Indian or American forces at Ayni.

During the Cold War era, Ayni served as a major military base of the Soviet Union. However, following Soviet withdrawal from Afghanistan, the base's infrastructure deteriorated significantly. Between 2002 and 2010, India spent nearly US$70 million to renovate the air base — the runway was extended to 3,200 meters and state-of-the-art navigational and air defense equipment were installed. It was speculated by some media outlets that India was keen on establishing a military base in Ayni so as to gain a strategic foothold in Central Asia.

India has now renewed its interest in the Ayni airbase.  The scope and scale of India's military detachment in Ayni is yet a subject of discussion between India, Russia and Tajikistan. Russia patrols the Tajik skies and has a motorised rifle division deployed in Ayni.

Since being admitted to the Shanghai Cooperation Organisation (SCO) this year and participating in war games with its members, Delhi is enthusiastic to revive the relationship with Tajikistan, now that India-Russian ties are its zenith due to massive defence deals between two nations. Tajikistan is also a member of the Collective Security Treaty Organisation (CSTO), along with Russia, Armenia, Kazakhstan and Kyrgyzstan. It may require a green signal from the CSTO to allow Indian military operations at Ayni.

The IAF appointed then Group Captain Naseem Akhtar (Retd) to begin the work on the airbase. Akhtar, who retired as Air Commodore, was followed by another officer. The Indian government also involved the Border Roads Organisation (BRO) team which was led by a Brigadier. At that point in time, there were around 200 Indians working on the project and the airstrip at Gissar was extended to 3,200 metres — long enough for most fixed-wing aircraft to land and take-off. Besides this, the Indian team also developed hangars, overhauling and the refuelling capacity of aircraft. It is estimated that India spent close to $US100 million developing the base. Air Chief Marshal Birender Singh Dhanoa was appointed the first Base Commander of the base around the end of 2005 when he was a Group Captain.

See also
Geostrategy in Central Asia
Farkhor Air Base

References

Tajik Air Force
Aviation in Tajikistan
Airports in Tajikistan
Indian Overseas Military bases
Indian Air Force bases
Districts of Republican Subordination
Military installations in Tajikistan
Soviet Air Force bases